Margaret Ferguson Books is a publishing imprint that has been located at:
Farrar, Straus and Giroux (2011-2017)
Holiday House (2017-present)